The Pont Julien (French for Julian Bridge) is a Roman stone arch bridge over the Calavon river, in the south-east of France, dating from 3 BC. The supporting columns are notable for openings to allow floodwater to pass through.
It is located in the territory of the commune of Bonnieux, north of the village of the same name, and
8 km west of Apt. Originally, it was built on the Via Domitia, an important Roman road which connected Italy to the Roman territories in France. It was used for car traffic until 2005, when a replacement bridge was built to preserve it from wear and tear. It is still used as bike- and footpath. This amounts to approximately 2000 years of uninterrupted use.

Gallery

See also
List of bridges in France
List of Roman bridges
Roman architecture
Roman engineering

References

External links 

 
 Traianus – Technical investigation of Roman public works

Roman bridges in France
Deck arch bridges
Stone bridges in France
Bridges completed in the 1st century BC
Buildings and structures in Vaucluse
Transport in Provence-Alpes-Côte d'Azur
Tourist attractions in Vaucluse